BBS 2 is a Dzongkha and English 24 hours international channel that broadcasts general entertainment owned by the Bhutan Broadcasting Service.

References

Television channels and stations established in 2012
Television stations in Bhutan